The Beijing Shooting Range Clay Target Field is a shooting range in the Shijingshan District of Beijing, China. During the 1990 Asian Games, the shooting range was used for shooting and  archery competitions. It was under renovation and was completed in August 2007 for the 2008 Summer Olympics.

At the 2008 Olympics, the shooting range hosted men's and women's skeet shooting and trap shooting events.

It has floor space of 6,170 square metres with a capacity of 5,000 seats which was reduced to 1,047 after the Games.

References

Venues of the 2008 Summer Olympics
Olympic shooting venues
Sports venues in Beijing
Shooting ranges in China
Venues of the 1990 Asian Games
Asian Games archery venues